The Into the Millennium Tour was the fourth concert tour by the Backstreet Boys in support of their third studio album, Millennium (1999). The tour comprised 123 in 84 cities spanning three legs. The North American legs featured concerts at arenas and stadiums and it became the fastest grossing tour of all time.

The tour was beaten by the Bruce Springsteen and the E Street Band Reunion Tour for the Pollstar Concert Industry Award for Major Tour of the Year for 1999, but won the award for Most Creative Stage Production.

Background

Before the tour commenced, the group filmed a Disney Channel concert special on May 11, 1999 from the New Amsterdam Theatre in New York City. The first leg of the tour was a European leg, which ran from June 2–August 7, 1999 and featured more than 40 concerts in over 30 cities and 13 countries. The first leg of the North American tour initially sold 53 dates (40 announced and 13 added due to demand) in 39 cities, scheduled to run from September 14–December 2, 1999. The entire leg sold out on the August 14 onsale date. The reported 765,000 tickets grossed sales estimated at $30 million, with face values set at $28.50 and $38.50, putting the entire tour on sale on one morning was an unusual sales method which allowed the on sale to become an event and resulted in broken sales records. A majority of the tickets sold out within the first hour of the sale, and several venues set records for sell-out speed. After adding several additional shows, the leg ultimately comprised 53 shows with some venues hosting three consecutive shows. As a result of Hurricane Floyd, which was approaching Florida, the band was forced to postpone the first two tour dates from September 14 and 15 to December 5 and 6.

This leg (if not also the final leg) was officially titled "Sears Presents Backstreet Boys Into The Millennium Tour", as Sears sponsored at least the first North American leg, as did Polaroid. The second North American leg of the tour ran from February 11–March 15, 2000. The concert at Georgia Dome, Atlanta, was the 5th most attended concert in American history and the most attended concert by a pop artist.

Ticket controversy
There was some controversy over the distribution of tickets at the Denver show of the first tour leg by promoter House of Blues Concerts. It was alleged that House of Blues had reserved a large number of tickets not purchased by season-ticket holders to private brokers, instead of offering them to the public. The brokers then resold the tickets for well above face value. The band subsequently requested that House of Blues donate $75,000 to a Columbine High School scholarship fund as compensation for their actions. The promoter agreed to donate to Columbine victims but said it would offer the donation to a group of its choosing, claiming the Columbine College Fund, chosen by the band's management, might not have been legitimate.

Production

Staging
The staging for the tour featured a pentagonal stage which situated in the center of each venue, with a 360-degree in the round design.

The stage featured a pentagonal outer track with five ramps to a central circular platform. This platform would normally be higher than the rest of the stage but could be lowered down below the stage to allow the band to enter from or exit the "understage" area (equivalent to "backstage"); the ramps would adjust accordingly. The platform and ramps could also be positioned flat at the level of the rest of the stage, creating a flat stage with only a slight step-up from the outer track to the center area.

The instrumental band was situated in the space between the outer track and the central platform, with band members separated from each other by the ramps. The stage was also accessible by stairways down off the outer edge of the stage to the venue floor, from where the "understage" could also be accessed. Among those involved in designing the staging was Mark Rabbit.

Performance and show elements
The band was backed by both a six-member instrumental band and a complement of ten backup dancers (five male and five female). The band would sometimes split up and perform with one member to each side or corner of the stage, but for much of the show, they performed to one side at a time, circling the stage (often as part of the choreographed dancing) throughout each song. The backup dancers sometimes performed on the opposite sides of the stage as the band. A video feed of the show was shown on video screens circling the overhead lighting rig.

The boys began each show in a curtained-off enclosure on the floor of the venue. The dancers carried torches onto the stage while marching to the prerecorded track of "The Imperial March". The boys would then rise from the curtained enclosure to the Star Wars theme song and ride to the stage on "hovering" surfboards employing wire harnesses. They would circle the stage and present themselves to each side of the audience before starting the first song, "Larger than Life".

The boys used several costume changes during the show. They wore "futuristic/space" costumes for the first segment of the concert. Two versions of these costumes were built: The original outfits featured blue checkerboard turtlenecks under padded blue vests. The later outfits (introduced as of February 19, 2000, in Atlanta, Georgia on the third leg of the tour). featured molded armor-like tops which were individually designed for each member. Both costumes featured plain black pants. As the press is typically only permitted to photograph concerts for the first several songs, most press photos of the tour were of the band in their "space" costumes.

After the first three songs, each band member would separately introduce themselves to the audience as the others changed into their next costume. Initially, this change involved removing the padded vests and wearing dark trench coats over the checkerboard turtlenecks from the space costumes. Later in the tour, the group donned black V-neck undershirts with the trenchcoats. They performed "As Long As You Love Me" with the song's signature "chair routine". The backup dancers performed an extended chair routine and the band played an extended instrumental outro as the boys changed into leather outfits for the next songs "Don't Wanna Lose You Now" and "Quit Playing Games (With My Heart)", during which the boys were again hooked up to wire harnesses and flown over the crowd (each to a different side of the audience) during the song's outro. They would throw stuffed animals out to audience members from the air. During the extended instrumental outro to that song, the band would again change into red and black motocross racing deflectors (plastic upper body armor) on top of black shirts and pants. Metal ladders were added to the corners of the stage for the boys to climb and hang on to during the next song, "Don't Want You Back".

They removed the deflectors for the next song, "The Perfect Fan", which they performed with five sets of mothers and daughters from the audience brought onstage (Brian, Kevin, and Howie brought their mothers up at one point). Following that, a grand piano was lowered onto the central platform, and Kevin Richardson played a piano duet with saxophonist Mindi Abair, leading into "Back To Your Heart", which Richardson co-wrote. Nick Carter also played drums at some of the later concerts. After another costume change into white outfits and an extended intro, the boys performed an up-tempo medley of "Everybody (Backstreet's Back)", "We've Got It Goin' On" and "That's The Way I Like It".

An instrumental jazz melody was used to allow the band to change into suits (initially pink, but replaced with dark pin-striped suits later in the tour). They were raised on the central platform with stools and mic stands to sing a string of ballads. They added matching fedoras for the "hat-dance" routine in "All I Have To Give". "Show Me the Meaning of Being Lonely" featured five of the female dancers slow-dancing on the outer track while the boys remained on the upper platform until after the bridge when the band members came down to the track to slow-dance with a dancer. They returned to the platform and were lowered under the stage to end the song, and ostensibly end the concert.

As an encore, the boys returned to the stage in street clothes to perform "It's Gotta Be You" with a break in the song to introduce each of the dancers and allow each pair of male and female dancer to do a brief routine. They then introduced each instrumental band member and gave each a solo. Finally, they circled the stage to bow to each side of the audience under a blast of confetti and ended the song, and again, ostensibly, the concert.

The boys returned once more with the final encore, "I Want It That Way", often adding a local sports jersey to their previous street clothes. After ending the song, an instrumental outro was played as the boys said their final goodnights, fooled around, shook hands with the audience members and had a sing-along with the crowd to the final choruses of the song.

Merchandising
The Backstreet Boys agreed to a merchandising tie-in with Burger King to exclusively sell a set of three CDs and one VHS cassette featuring songs and videos respectively from the tour. Each For The Fans CD contained three live tracks from the tour, as well as three studio-recorded tracks, and enhanced computer content. The video contained footage of five songs, as well as interviews and other footage from around the tour. The material comes mainly from the concert in Indianapolis, Indiana.

Pre-Tour Setlist (as filmed for the Disney Channel In Concert)
 "Larger Than Life"
 "Quit Playing Games (With My Heart)"
 "As Long as You Love Me"
 "All I Have to Give"
 "Show Me the Meaning of Being Lonely"
 "I'll Never Break Your Heart"
 "Everybody (Backstreet's Back)"
 "I Want It That Way"
 "The Perfect Fan" (featuring The Boys Choir of Harlem)

Setlist
"Larger than Life"
"Get Down (You're the One For Me)"
"The One"
"As Long as You Love Me"
"Don't Wanna Lose You Now"
"Quit Playing Games (With My Heart)"
"Don't Want You Back"
"The Perfect Fan"
"Back to Your Heart"
"Everybody (Backstreet's Back)"  
"We've Got It Goin' On" 
"That's the Way I Like It"
"Spanish Eyes"
"I'll Never Break Your Heart"
"No One Else Comes Close"
"All I Have to Give"
"Show Me the Meaning of Being Lonely"
 Encore
"It's Gotta Be You"
 "I Want It That Way"

Tour dates

Cancellations and rescheduled shows

Personnel
Lead Vocals: Kevin Richardson, Brian Littrell, Howie Dorough, Nick Carter, AJ McLean
Tour Director: 
Tour Manager: Paul 'Skip' Rickert
Assistant Tour Manager: Tim Krieg
Co-Director: Denise McLean
Co-Director: Nicole Peltz
Press Liaison: Leila Eminson
Tour Accountant: Vincent Corry
Staff Photographer: Andre Csillig
Musical Director: William 'Bubba' Bryant
Costume Design: Jill Focke, Kerstin 'Kiki' Theileis, Janine Schreiber
Choreographer: Fatima Robinson**
Assistant Choreographer: Richard "Swoop" Whitebear***

Security
Billy Evans: Nick's Security
Tom LeBrun: Head of Security/Brian's Security
Marc Preston: Howie's Security
Marcus Johnson: AJ's Security
Carlos Cardenas: Kevin's Security
John "Q" Elgani: Security*****

Band
Keyboards: Tommy Smith
Guitars: Guy Walker, Dennis Gallo
Percussion / Saxophone: Mindi Abair
Drums: William 'Bubba' Bryant
Bass: Louie Vigilante

Dancers
Kristin Denehy (now Cameron) (1999-2000)
Teresa LeBron (1999-2000)
Earl "Sleepy" Manning (1999-2000)
Roland "RoRo" Tabor (1999)*
Nicole "Nikki" DeLecia (1999-?)
"Elmo" (1999)*
Reginald "Reggie" Jackson (1999-2000)
Nefertiti Robinson** (1999-?)*
Amy Allen (1999)*
Richard "Swoop" Whitebear*** (1999)*
Richmond "Rich" Talauega (Europe 1999, 2000)****
Anthony "Tone" Talauega (2000)****
Ed Moore (1999)*
"Flli" 
Raymond "Ray" Ultarte (1999, RIP)*
Melanie Lewis (now Lewis-Yribar)
Angela Elgani (née Randle)*****

Notes
Indicates which dancer appear in 1999 * 
Fatima and Nefertiti Robinson are sisters ** 
Swoop also assists Fatima for the rest of the tour *** 
Brothers Rich and Tone also choreograph the Boys' following tours: Never Gone, IAWLT, DNA and their Vegas residency **** 
One of the dancers, Angela, recently married Backstreet Boys security, John "Q" Elgani *****

References

Backstreet Boys concert tours
1999 concert tours
2000 concert tours